Aphanius marassantensis, also known as the Kızılırmak toothcarp, is a species of pupfish endemic to the basin of the Kızılırmak River in Turkey. The species is named after Marassanta, the Hittite language word for the Kızılırmak.

References 

Aphanius
Fish of Turkey